Events in the year 2019 in Slovenia.

Incumbents
President: Borut Pahor
Prime Minister: Marjan Šarec

Events
 1 January – a ban on single-use plastic shopping bags comes into effect.
 26 May - voters select members of the European Parliament from Slovenia in the European Parliament election.
 13–29 September – Slovenia, Belgium, France, and the Netherlands host the 31st Men's European Volleyball Championship; Slovenia team win second place after losing against Serbia in the finals.

Deaths
22 March – Zinka Zorko, linguist (b. 1936)
 18 April - Iča Putrih, comedian (b. 1942)
 18 August - Ivan Oman, politician (b. 1929)
 26 August - Zmago Modic, painter (b. 1953)
 16 September - Davo Karničar, alpinist, extreme skier (b. 1962)
 24 September - Dušan Hadži, chemist (b. 1921)

See also
 	

 		
 2019 European Parliament election

References

 
2010s in Slovenia
Years of the 21st century in Slovenia
Slovenia
Slovenia